Changshu Road is an interchange station between lines 1 and 7 of the Shanghai Metro. It is situated in Shanghai's Xuhui District, within the inner ring-road. Furthermore, it provides access to the shopping street Huaihai Road, Shanghai Conservatory of Music as well as the former colonial neighborhood previously called The French Concession.

Line 10 passes close by, but does not stop here due to construction difficulties.

Station Layout

Places nearby
 Huaihai Road, shopping street
 Shanghai Conservatory of Music

References

Line 1, Shanghai Metro
Line 7, Shanghai Metro
Shanghai Metro stations in Xuhui District
Railway stations in China opened in 1995
Railway stations in Shanghai